John Hammond Jr. (born 1942) is American musician John P. Hammond (and son of producer John H. Hammond).

John Hammond Jr. also may refer to:
 John Hays Hammond Jr. (1888–1965), American engineer 
 John Henry Hammond Jr. (1910–1987), American producer a.k.a. John H. Hammond

See also
John Hammond (disambiguation)